The 1976–77 SM-liiga season was the second season of the SM-liiga, the top level of ice hockey in Finland. 10 teams participated in the league, and Tappara Tampere won the championship.

Standings

Playoffs

Semifinal
 Tappara - KooVee 3:0 (11:0, 6:1, 11:3)
 TPS - HIFK 3:2 (4:7, 2:4, 2:1, 3:0, 4:2)

3rd place
 HIFK - KooVee 0:2 (4:5, 5:9)

Final
 Tappara - TPS 3:0 (7:2, 4:2, 9:1)

Relegation

External links
 SM-liiga official website

1976–77 in Finnish ice hockey
Fin
Liiga seasons